Richard Michael Mullally (born 27 June 1978) is an Irish sportsperson.  He played right wing back on the Kilkenny senior hurling team.

Richie Mullally was born in Davidstown County Kilkenny in 1978.  A dairy and cereal farmer by profession, Mr. Mullally plays his local club hurling with Glenmore.  Since beginning his playing career at inter-county level in 2002 he has won 5 All-Ireland medals, 5 Leinster Championship medals and 4 National Hurling League medals. Mullally also has a host of underage awards as well as County Championship medal.  His brother, Paddy Mullally, was also a member of the Kilkenny senior hurling panel winning an All Ireland Senior medal in 2003.

His brother Tom is a manager.

References 

1978 births
Living people
Glenmore hurlers
Kilkenny inter-county hurlers
Leinster inter-provincial hurlers